Petr Brdičko (born 7 May 1988) is a Czech songwriter and occasional actor who was born and raised in Prague.

Career 
In childhood, Petr was part of Prague children choir. 

He appeared in Czech movie Ctrl Emotion, in non released music video of George Michael′s song Where I Hope You Are or in Staropramen advertisement spots. He is also thanked for his donation to Czech movie Krásno.

Songwriting discography

References

External links
 https://www.youtube.com/watch?v=E5GwT65tmrc
 https://www.youtube.com/watch?v=ZeKxgt5VDfM
 https://www.youtube.com/watch?v=mJkiP3LH0rE

Living people
Czech songwriters
1988 births